Rostislav Borisovich Rybakov ((28 March 1938 – 7 August 2019) in Moscow, Russia was a Russian scholar of Oriental Studies, writer, Indologist and the director of the Institute of Oriental Studies of the Russian Academy of Sciences (Institute of Oriental Studies). He heads the Institute of Oriental Manuscripts of the Academy and is a former president (2006–2008) of the Dialogue Eurasia Platform (DAP), one of the five forums under the Journalists and Writers Foundation (JWF), promoting peaceful coexistence through dialogue and understanding. He has also been associated with the International Centre of the Roerichs and is one of the founders of PEACE through CULTURE, a non governmental organization based in Austria.

He was a son of Russian historian Boris Rybakov.

The Government of India awarded him the fourth highest civilian honour of the Padma Shri, in 2007, for his contributions to literature and education. He is also a recipient of the Labour Valour Fund Award of 2013.

Rybakov died on 7 August 2019 at the age of 81.

See also 
 Nicholas Roerich

References 

Recipients of the Padma Shri in literature & education
Russian Indologists
Russian orientalists
1938 births
2019 deaths